UFC 82: Pride of a Champion was a mixed martial arts (MMA) event that took place on March 1, 2008, at the Nationwide Arena in Columbus, Ohio.

Background
The main event was a UFC & Pride FC middleweight title unification match between UFC middleweight champion Anderson Silva and PRIDE FC welterweight champion Dan Henderson.

A welterweight matchup between Jon Fitch and Akihiro Gono was originally scheduled, but Gono was forced to withdraw after suffering a hand injury in training. Gono was replaced by Chris Wilson. The Fitch/Gono match up was eventually rescheduled for UFC 94.

Diego Sanchez was originally scheduled to faced Roan Carneiro but an undisclosed illness forced out Carneiro. David Bielkheden replaced Carneiro.

At the event, former UFC heavyweight champion Mark Coleman was inducted into the UFC Hall of Fame.

Results

Bonus awards
At the end of this event, $60,000 was awarded to each of the fighters who received one of these three awards.

Fight of the Night: Anderson Silva vs. Dan Henderson
Knockout of the Night: Chris Leben
Submission of the Night: Anderson Silva

See also
 Ultimate Fighting Championship
 List of UFC champions
 List of UFC events
 2008 in UFC

References

External links
UFC 82 Website
UFC 82 Fight Card
"Blood in the Cage" book excerpt – describes pre-fight scene of UFC 82.

Ultimate Fighting Championship events
Events in Columbus, Ohio
2008 in mixed martial arts
Mixed martial arts in Ohio
2008 in sports in Ohio
Sports competitions in Columbus, Ohio